China's Tax-Sharing Reform in 1994 was a fiscal and taxation system reform initiated by the Chinese government in 1992, prepared and promulgated in 1993, and finally implemented in 1994. The reform was a large-scale adjustment of the tax distribution system and tax structure between the central and local governments, which was regarded as a milestone in the transition of China's fiscal system from planned economy to market economy. The main purpose of the tax-sharing reform is to alleviate the budget deficit since the end of the 1980s. As the reform achieved indeed remarkable results, it yet evoked problems like heavier financial burden of local governments. In order to make ends meet, governments started to let lands (also known as land finance) which eventually pushed up the land and housing price. Therefore, the tax-sharing reform is considered to be the reason of China's severe land finance.

History 
In 1978, since China implemented the reform and opening up policy, China gradually got rid of the planned economic system and experienced a clear process of decentralization in the social and economic fields, including the decentralization of powers over financial administration. Compared with the fiscal system that was previously unified, the local government acquired independent budgeting rights and certain financial autonomy. For instance, local governments could determine their budget expenditures without interference from the central government. Prior to the fiscal reform in 1994, everything was pre-determined and the government revenues was divided into three categories: central income, local income, and shared income, and every year local governments only paid a fixed amount of fiscal tax to the central government. In some places, local governments reduced or exempted corporate taxation in order to keep the money to their own. Some economists believed that this was the cause of inflation in China in the late 1980s. During this period, the central government was found in serious crisis and even borrowed money from local governments. The proportion of fiscal revenue to the gross national product, and that of the central government's fiscal revenue to the overall fiscal revenue both declined rapidly, leading to a lack of funds for the construction of national defence and infrastructure investment. Before the tax-sharing reform in 1993, the central government obtained only 22% of the fiscal revenues while the local governments kept the rest, which made the former unable to make ends meet.

In 1994, the tax-sharing reform was officially implemented, when the central government's fiscal revenue reached an unprecedented growth of 203.5%. However, in 2000, the Ministry of Finance and the State Administration of Taxation disagreed on whether they should keep raising the percentage of government revenue to GDP. While the Minister of Finance Xiang Huaicheng still advocated doing so, Jin Renqing, the director of the State Administration of Taxation, advocated flexible adjustment to the tax system. In 2010, with the steady growth of the central government's fiscal revenue, local governments started to manifest disagreements. By 2015, when the central government's fiscal revenue reached 50% of the total amount, the central government's fiscal expenditure accounted for only 15%, which aggravated the disequilibrium between the central and local governments' financial powers, making it hard for local governments to go through budgeting and implementation process.

Measures 
On 25 December 1993, the State Council issued the "Decision on Implementing the Tax-Sharing Financial Management System". The article stipulated the implementation of the tax-sharing reform, started from 1 January 1994, in all provinces, autonomous regions and municipalities directly under the central government.

Decentralization of Authority 
The "Decision on Implementing the Tax-Sharing Financial Management System" clarified the decentralization of authority. From then on, the central government was mainly responsible for the funds required by national security, diplomacy, operation of the central state organs, adjustment of the national economic structure, coordination with regional developments, implementation of macroeconomic regulations and enterprises directly managed by the central government, when local governments mainly bore the expenditures for the operation of their own political organs and their economic and career developments.

According to the reform, the central government expenditures were listed hereinafter: defence expenditures, armed police funds, expenditures for foreign affairs, central administrative fees, central capital investment for infrastructures, funds for technical transformation and new product trial launched by state-owned enterprises, geological exploration fees, agricultural expenditures arranged by the central government, debt service expenses of domestic and foreign debts borne by the central government, and public expenses including culture, education, health, science, etc.

On the other hand, local governments should cover local administrative management fees, public security expenditures, part of the armed police funds, expenses for militia development, local infrastructure investment, funds for technological transformation and new product trial launched by local enterprises, agricultural expenditures, urban maintenance and construction funds, and other expenses for local culture, education and health, etc.

Reform of Tax Policy 
The tax-sharing reform in 1994 reclassified the central tax, the local tax, and the shared tax, which enabled more tax sources for central government. According to the "Decision on Implementing the Tax-Sharing Financial Management System", firstly, central tax included taxations that were essential to safeguard national interests and implement macroeconomic regulations. Secondly, taxations directly related to economic development are classified as shared taxes. Thirdly, taxations suitable for local collection and management are classified as local tax, and categories of which were enriched in order to increase local tax revenues. The legislative authority of central tax, shared tax and local tax were still centralized by the central government to ensure the unification of national orders and to maintain a unified national market and a fair competition environment for enterprises.

As clarified in the tax-sharing reform in 1994, the central fixed income consisted of customs duties, authorized collection of consumption tax and value-added tax by customs, consumption tax, central corporate income tax, local bank, foreign-funded bank and non-bank financial enterprise income tax, the central enterprise pays off profits, as well as taxes (including business tax, income tax, profit and urban maintenance and construction tax) turned over by railway department, head office of bank, and insurance company. The export tax rebate for foreign trade enterprises was borne by the central government.

Local fixed income are listed hereinafter: business tax (excluding taxes from railway departments, head offices of banks and insurance companies), local enterprise income tax (excluding taxes from local banks, foreign banks and non-bank financial enterprises), personal income tax, urban and township land use tax, fixed asset investment direction adjustment tax, urban maintenance and construction tax (excluding taxes from railway departments, head offices of banks and insurance companies), property tax, vehicle and vessel usage tax, Stamp Duty Land Tax, agriculture and animal husbandry tax, tax on special agricultural products, farm land occupation tax, tax deed, inheritance and gift tax, land value increment tax, and payment for usage of state-owned lands.

As for shared tax, 75% of VAT goes into the central government while the remaining belongs to local governments; Resource tax (except the offshore petroleum resource tax) is shared equally; Local governments used to process 50% of securities exchange tax, but stamp tax on securities trading goes fully into the central government since 1 January 2016.

Supporting Reform Measures 
Supporting measures proposed by the government included reorganizing the tax structure, cancelling some unreasonable taxes and introducing taxes that are more in line with market-oriented reform. For example, the government established a commodity-turnover-tax system with VAT as the main body, in which product tax, consumption tax, and construction fund for projects of energy and transportation turned in by state-owned enterprises no longer existed. The reform required rational adjustment of the distribution of financial resources between regions. In order to protect the interests of each province and city, especially to take into account the vested interests of developed regions and the development of poverty-stricken areas and the transformation of old industrial bases, a set of regimes pertaining to tax returns and transfer payment was designed, which related highly to the level of economic development has.

At the same time, the reform measures also proposed that financial expenditures of local governments would be restricted. In order to cope with the reform of the tax-sharing system, the People's Bank of China initiated the market of national debt, allowing state-owned commercial banks to enter the national debt market and banks, non-bank financial institutions as well, to use the national debt as discount credit. The secondary market of treasury bonds was coordinated and managed by relevant departments in order to regularize the issuance of treasury bonds and marketize the interest rate of treasury bonds

Results 
China's 1994 tax reform marked a substantial step in China's fiscal system marching from the planned economy to the market economy. This tax reform reduced the problems caused by the local government's original fiscal and taxation system and increased rapidly the national fiscal revenue. In 1994, when the reform measures were officially implemented for the first time, the central government revenue achieved an unprecedented growth of 203.5%. From 1993 to 2012, the national public finance income increased from 434.90 billion yuan to 561.723 billion yuan, which was an increase of 26.96 times in total and an increase of 19.02% on the annual basis. China's fiscal revenue occupied a bigger percentage in the proportion of gross national product, and the percentage of national public finance revenue out of GDP increased from 12.30% in 1993 to 22.58% in 2012.

Based on the rapid growth of national fiscal revenue, the central government's share of total fiscal revenue achieved also a sharp growth, which ameliorated the financial situation of the central government. The reform guaranteed a steady growth of the central government's fiscal revenue and control capacity of its macroeconomic regulation from the institutional level. The rapid growth of fiscal revenues guaranteed also the funds for infrastructure construction, which in turn enabled the military, armed police, political and legal institutions and party and government organs to do business in 1998.

The tax-sharing reform in 1994 mobilized the enthusiasm of local governments to participate in fiscal and tax reforms, and led to economic competition between local governments for fiscal revenue. At the same time, the tax-sharing reform weakened the expansion effect of the political cycle on local fiscal expenditures. With the implementation of the tax-sharing reform, a transfer payment system was established in order to alleviate the disparity in financial resources between regions. This reform unified the tax system for domestic-funded enterprises, which build a relatively fair market competition environment for domestic enterprises.

New Problems 
This tax reform increased significantly the amount of central government revenue, but the problem of fiscal deficits still existed, which led to an imbalance between central and local fiscal expenditures and a distortion of the relationship between China's central government and local governments. Through the implementation of the tax-sharing system and the direct control from the national taxation department, the central government mastered nearly 60% of the financial power, while a large number of devolutions was delegated to the local government, which increased their burdens and affected their effective operations, especially for basic-level governments.

The academic circles discovered ever since the housing market reform in 1998, China's urban housing prices continued to rise due to the land finance and the tax-sharing reform. They also found out that China's government fiscal revenues were transferred to higher-level government while social security responsibilities were transferred to lower-level governments. As a result, the financial institutions at basic levels that were responsible for social security functions encountered the problem of financial strain, resulting in the weakness of social security functions.  Besides, the existing transfer payment system was highly correlated with the level of economic development, yet local government expenditures in backward and rural areas showed an unreasonable structure, which intensified the lack of social security supply.

Policy Adjustment 
After 22 years of the implementation of the tax-sharing reform in 1994, the central government began to adjust and amend the policy. During the 2016 National Conference, the State Council issued "the Guideline on Promoting the Reform of the Division of Financial Powers between the Central and Local Governments", and decided to strengthen moderately the financial governance of the central government. At the same time, the guideline clarified that the Ministry of Finance, the Central Organization and other relevant departments were mainly responsible for organizing, coordinating, guiding, supervising and promoting this adjustment.

In addition, the Guideline provided a timetable for the reform. In 2016, it took the lead in launching the reform in fiscal affairs and expenditure responsibility in the field of national defence and foreign affairs. From 2017 to 2018, the government strived to make progress in basic public services such as education, health care, environmental protection, and transportation. From 2019 to 2020, the focus of the reform was achieved, and the contents that need to be brought into laws will be clarified, after which the State Council will promulgate administrative regulations and submits relevant laws to the National People's Congress. In addition, the State Council will also draft the Intergovernmental Financial Relations Law and promote the formation of a scientific and rational legal system that guarantees the division of financial affairs and expenditures.

References 

1994 in China
Finance in China
Tax reform